Rifkat Ibragimovich Bogdanov (June 13, 1950 – November 3, 2013) was a Soviet and Russian mathematician known for contributions to nonlinear dynamical systems, bifurcation theory, and differential geometry. He was an ethnic Tatar. In his work on bifurcations of limit cycles and versal deformations of singular points of vector fields (1975–76), he described a bifurcation of co-dimension 2, which has become known in the literature as the Bogdanov–Takens bifurcation.

Born in the village of Mamykovo in Tatarstan, Bogdanov had a doctorate in physico-mathematical sciences and was a professor in two Russian research organizations: the Skobeltsyn Institute of Nuclear Physics at Lomonosov Moscow State University and the Department of Higher Mathematics at MATI — the Tsiolkovskii State Technological University.

See also 
 Bogdanov–Takens bifurcation

Selected publications 
 R. I. Bogdanov (1975). "Versal deformation of a singular point of a vector field with zero eigenvalues," Functional Analysis and Its Applications 9: 63 [in Russian].
 R. I. Bogdanov (1976). "Bifurcations of the limit cycle of a family of vector fields on a plane," Transactions I. G. Petrovskii Seminar, Moscow State University 2: 23–35 [in Russian; English translation in Selecta Mathematica Sovietica 1: 373–388, 1981].
 R. I. Bogdanov (1979). "Versal deformations of singular points of vector fields on a plane," Functional Analysis and Its Applications 13: 63–64 [in Russian; English translation available].
 R. I. Bogdanov (2003). Nonlinear Dynamical Systems on a Plane and Their Applications, Vuzovskaya Kniga Publishing House, Moscow [in Russian].

References 
 Math-Net.Ru/Persons . Accessed on September 29, 2007.
 Home pages of the Skobeltsyn Institute of Nuclear Physics  and  Tsiolkovskii State Technological University . Accessed on September 29, 2007.
 Web site of Russia's Genealogical Tree . Accessed on September 29, 2007.
 Mention of Rifkat Bogdanov's death 

1950 births
2013 deaths
Tatar people of Russia
Soviet mathematicians
21st-century Russian mathematicians
Tatar people of the Soviet Union